Josef Moosholzer (1932–2004) was a German film and television actor. He starred in several sex comedies during the 1970s.

Filmography

References

Bibliography
 Annette Miersch. Schulmädchen-Report: der deutsche Sexfilm der 70er Jahre. Bertz, 2003.

External links

1932 births
2004 deaths
German male television actors
German male film actors